Bhima Yadav is a Nepalese politician who is member of Provincial Assembly of Madhesh Province from People's Socialist Party, Nepal. Yadav is a resident of Birgunj, Parsa.

References

Living people
Members of the Provincial Assembly of Madhesh Province
Madhesi people
People from Birgunj
People's Socialist Party, Nepal politicians
1958 births